Constantine Opos can refer to:

 Constantine Opos (catepan), Byzantine Catepan of Italy in 1033–1038
 Constantine Opos (megas doux), Byzantine general in the reign of Alexios I Komnenos (1081–1118)

fr:Constantin Opos